Renuka Menon is a former Indian actress who has predominantly appeared in Malayalam films. She also acted in few Tamil, Telugu and Kannada language films.

Career 

In 2005, Menon entered the Tamil and Kannada film industries, through the films February 14, alongside Bharath, and News opposite Upendra, respectively. Later that year, she starred in another Tamil film, Daas alongside Jayam Ravi. However, none of the films succeeded. In 2006, she acted in the Malayalam film Vargam, pairing up with Prithviraj again after Meerayude Dukhavum Muthuvinte Swapnavum in 2003, which was an average grosser, following which, she appeared in the Tamil film Kalabha Kadhalan opposite Arya and in the multi-starrer Pathaaka. Her film Madhan, directed by actor Jai Akash, starring himself and Sunaina, has been pending for a long time and was expected to release in late 2009 after years-long delay.

Personal life

Renuka married a software engineer based in US on 21 November 2006, with whom she has two daughters. After her marriage, she stopped acting and now runs a dance school in California.

Filmography

References

External links 
 

Indian film actresses
Actresses in Tamil cinema
Living people
Actresses in Malayalam cinema
Actresses from Thrissur
21st-century Indian actresses
Actresses in Kannada cinema
Actresses in Telugu cinema
Year of birth missing (living people)